Ryan Zeze (born 29 January 1998) is a French athlete. He competed in the men's 4 × 100 metres relay event at the 2020 Summer Olympics.

References

External links
 

1998 births
Living people
French male sprinters
Athletes (track and field) at the 2020 Summer Olympics
Olympic athletes of France
People from Louviers
European Athletics Championships medalists